William Augustus Edwards, also known as William A. Edwards (December 8, 1866 – March 30, 1939) was an Atlanta-based American architect renowned for the educational buildings, courthouses and other public  and private buildings that he  designed in Florida, Georgia and his native South Carolina.  More than 25 of his works have been listed on the National Register of Historic Places.

Early life and education 

William Augustus Edwards was born in Darlington, South Carolina, the son of Augustus Fulton Edwards and his wife, Elizabeth Sarah Hart. After graduating from St. David's School in Society Hill, Edwards attended Richmond College, now the University of Richmond for one year and then entered the University of South Carolina where he received a degree in mechanical engineering in 1889.

Career history 

He and another Darlington County native, Charles Coker Wilson, set up an office together in Columbia, having previously worked in Roanoke, Virginia.  The two men prospered for a time, but in 1901 Edwards found a new partner, Frank C. Walter.  Between then and 1908 the two designed many public school buildings across the state.  In 1908 the men moved their firm to Atlanta, Georgia, where they were briefly associated with an architect named Parnham.  The firm lasted until 1911, at which point Walter left to work on his own.

In 1915 Edwards established another partnership, this one with William J. Sayward, and in 1919 Joseph Leitner joined the practice.  Edwards continued working successfully from this office until his death in 1939.

Marriage and family 

William Augustus Edwards married India Pearl Brown on December 21, 1898. They had two sons and two daughters. He was a  member of the Unitarian Church.

Educational buildings 

Among the academic institutions for which Edwards designed buildings were:

In Alabama

Camp Hill 

In 1930 William A. Edwards and firm designed the educational classroom and administrative building for The Southern Industrial Institute, now known as Lyman Ward Military Academy, in Camp Hill, AL. The structure known as Tallapoosa Hall was designed at the request of well known educator Dr. Lyman Ward who like Edwards was also a Unitarian. Dr. Ward had transplanted to Alabama in 1898 to establish a school for impoverished boys and girls. Completed in 1933, Tallapoosa Hall is also a Gothic Revival design and the building was added to the Alabama Register of Landmarks and Heritage in 2008.

In Florida 

From 1905-1925, William A. Edwards was architect for the Florida Board of Control and designed many buildings in the Collegiate Gothic style for the three existing state institutions of higher learning as well as other public schools.

Gainesville

University of Florida

As the main architect for Florida's newly reorganized system of higher education, Edwards designed numerous buildings for the University of Florida's new Gainesville campus, which first welcomed students in 1906. Most of his surviving works at the school had already been individually recognized by the National Register of Historic Places when the University of Florida Campus Historic District was established in the heart of the original campus in 1989.

Works by Edwards at the University of Florida:

St. Augustine
Florida School for the Deaf and Blind

Tallahassee

FAMU
Florida Agricultural & Mechanical University. Buildings designed by William Augustus Edwards include:

The Carnegie Library and perhaps other buildings designed by Edwards are among 14 contributing buildings in  Florida Agricultural and Mechanical College Historic District, NRHP-listed

FSU
Florida State College for Women (Florida State University). Buildings designed by William Augustus Edwards include:

Other
 Caroline Brevard Grammar School, 727 S. Calhoun St., Tallahassee, Florida (Edwards, William A.), NRHP-listed
 Lincoln High School, 438 W Brevard St, Tallahassee, Florida (Edwards, William A. and Sayward, William)
 Sealey Memorial Elementary School (demolished), 7th Avenue near Monroe Street, Tallahassee, Florida (Edwards, William A. and Sayward, William)
 W. H. Covington Residence, 328 Cortez Street, Tallahassee, Florida (Edwards, William A. and Sayward, William)
 Exchange Bank, Southeast corner of Monroe Street and College Avenue, Tallahassee, Florida (Edwards, William A. and Sayward, William)

In Georgia
Agnes Scott College, Decatur, Georgia: Buttrick Hall, 1930;  McCain Library, 1936
Columbia Theological Seminary, Decatur, Georgia
Georgia State Teachers College
 Georgia State Women's College (Valdosta State University)

In South Carolina
Clemson College (Clemson University)
Furman University, Greenville: Judson Alumni Hall, 1900–1961.
 Limestone College, Gaffney: Winnie Davis Hall, 1904,
 McMaster School, now USC's McMaster College, Columbia
South Carolina School for the Deaf and Blind, Spartanburg
University of South Carolina, Columbia: Currell College (originally the law school named Petigru College, but changed in 1950 to Currell when a new Petigru was built for the law school) 1919,.
 Walhalla Graded School, Walhalla, 1901
Winthrop College, Winthrop University, Rock Hill: Withers Building, Main Classroom - Office Building, 1912–1913.

County courthouses

William Augustus Edwards designed many county courthouses, as follows:

In Florida
 Hernando County Courthouse, 1913.
 Sumter County Courthouse (Florida), 1914

In Georgia

 Fannin County Courthouse, Georgia, 1937, replaced 2004 by new courthouse next door. Old one is leased as Georgia Mountain Center for the Arts.
 Tift County Courthouse (1912), Courthouse Sq., Tifton, Georgia, 1912–13, NRHP-listed Beaux Arts in style, listed on the National Register of Historic Places individually and as part of Tifton Commercial Historic District

In South Carolina
Between 1908 and 1915 Edwards designed nine county courthouses for the state of South Carolina, all of which are still standing except the ones in Kershaw  and Darlingon which were destroyed. The courthouses are as follows:
Abbeville County Courthouse, Court Sq. Abbeville, South Carolina, NRHP-listed
Calhoun County Courthouse, S. Railroad Ave., St. Matthews, South Carolina, NRHP-listed
Darlington County Courthouse,  1904–1964, replaced by highrise courthouse on same site
Dillon County Courthouse, 1303 W. Main St., Dillon, South Carolina. (Edwards, William Augustus), NRHP-listed
Kershaw County Courthouse, destroyed
Jasper County Courthouse, Russell St., Ridgeland, South Carolina, NRHP-listed
Lee County Courthouse, 123 Main St., Bishopville, South Carolina, NRHP-listed
Sumter County Courthouse, 141 N. Main St., Sumter, South Carolina, NRHP-listed
York County Courthouse, corner of W. Liberty and S. Congress Sts., York, South Carolina, NRHP-listed

Other buildings

In Florida
 Covington House, 328 Cortez St., Tallahassee, Florida, 1926, NRHP-listed
 Exchange Bank Building, Tallahassee, Florida
 Hotel Thomas, 1919, bounded by N.E. 2nd and 5th Sts. and N.E. 6th and 7th Aves., Gainesville, Florida, NRHP-listed

In Georgia
 City Hall and Firehouse, Bainbridge, Georgia
 Odd Fellows Building and Auditorium, 1912–1913, 228-250 Auburn Ave., NE, Atlanta, Georgia (Edwards, William A.), NRHP-listed
 University Homes in the Atlanta University Center area
 Unitarian Church of Atlanta, 669 West Peachtree Street, 1915
 United States Post Office and Courthouse (Columbus, Georgia), 1933
former Bank of Tifton (1917), Tifton, Georgia, a C&S Bank in 1985, "a fine example of the Neoclassical style", a contributing building in NRHP-listed Tifton Commercial Historic District
One or more works in Lakewood Heights Historic District, jct. of Jonesboro Rd. and Lakewood Ave., Atlanta, Georgia (Edwards, William), NRHP-listed
One or more works in Southern Railway North Avenue Yards Historic District, 539 John St. NW, Atlanta, Georgia (Edwards, William), NRHP-listed

In South Carolina
 Abbeville Opera House, Abbeville, South Carolina
 Cain House at 1619 Pendleton Street, Columbia, South Carolina. 1912. now The Inn at USC'.
 South Carolina State Armory, 1219 Assembly Street, Columbia, South Carolina, 1905, NRHP-listed

NRHP-listed works

More than 25 of his works have been listed on the National Register of Historic Places, either as individual buildings or as contributing buildings within historic districts.

Gallery

References

External links
Biography at the University of Florida library website
 Tate, Susan, Preservation and Compatible Growth of a Twentieth Century Campus: The University of Florida

1866 births
1939 deaths
People from Darlington, South Carolina
Architects from South Carolina
Florida State University people
University of Florida people
 
Architects from Atlanta
University of South Carolina alumni
19th-century American architects
20th-century American architects